John Parker Glick (1 July 1938 – 6 April 2017) was an American ceramicist. Though open to artistic experimentation, Glick was most influenced by the styles and aesthetics of Asian pottery—an inspiration that shows in his use of decorative patterns and glaze choices. His experience working with ceramics led him to publish several articles about the craft. In addition to producing pottery, Glick began making "landscape oriented" wall panels during the latter part of his career. Known as "the people's potter," he is primarily remembered for his contributions to art and the field of ceramics. 

Glick had operated Plum Tree Pottery in Farmington Hills, Michigan, from 1964 to 2016.

Education and career 
John Glick was born on 1 July 1938 in Detroit, Michigan. The child of two parents with an affinity for art, Glick began his life surrounded by creativity. His father, a grocery store manager, had an interest in gardening and painting; his mother, a homemaker, enjoyed cooking, sewing, and crafts. From a young age, Glick was included in his parents' projects, and he began formally studying art himself in high school.

As a student at Wayne State University, Glick studied geology for one semester, but quickly decided to major in both ceramics and metalwork instead. He earned his BFA degree in 1960. Studying under ceramicist Maija Grotell at Cranbrook Academy of Art, he received his MFA in 1962. After graduation, Glick was drafted and served in the United States Army until 1964. During that time, he was stationed in West Germany, in a town home to many salt-glazing potteries. Inspired by conversations with these potters, Glick strengthened his resolve to one day work full-time as a potter in his own studio.

Upon returning home to Michigan from the military in 1964, Glick founded his studio, Plum Tree Pottery. Over the course of his career, Glick, encouraged by an art collector he had met, decided to begin a personal collection of his own work. Over 50 years, he saved approximately 1,000 pieces—a large number, but a small fraction of the estimated 300,000 pieces he created in total. Though Glick admitted that saving those works was difficult "because they should have been out in the world," he was then able to use that personal collection as an aid for the 33 apprentices and residents with whom he worked at Plum Tree Pottery. He operated the studio until 2016, when he and his wife, Susie Symons, moved to California to be closer to their family.

One of the most crucial parts of a career so extensive, one that spanned five decades and yielded 300,000 pieces of pottery, was open-mindedness. Glick cited his "love of process" and "the ability to ask questions of [himself]" as two factors which shaped his career. The former led him to personally develop new tools and machinery in order to expand his physical means of creation. For example, he recalled "outgrow[ing]" his manual extruders and consequently designing his own hydraulic extruders to use instead. Similarly, the latter influenced how he conceived of his work in the first place, shaping how he decided what to create and how to create it.

Awards 

Glick has received the following awards:

2016: Nancy Coumoundouros Distinguished Service to the Arts Award, City of Farmington Hills, Michigan
2009: Invited Guest, International Ceramics Studio, Kecskemét, Hungary
2001: Governor's Michigan Artist Award, ArtServe Michigan (now Creative Many Michigan)
1990: Individual Artist's Grant, Michigan Council for the Arts
1988: Fellowship, National Endowment for the Arts
1977: Fellowship, National Endowment for the Arts
1977: Governor's Award, Michigan Foundation for the Arts
1972: Louis Comfort Tiffany Award, Louis Comfort Tiffany Foundation
1961: Louis Comfort Tiffany Award, Louis Comfort Tiffany Foundation

Museum collections 

Glick is represented in the following museum collections:

Canton Museum of Art, Canton, Ohio
Craft and Folk Art Museum, Los Angeles, California
Cranbrook Art Museum, Bloomfield Hills, Michigan
The Crocker Art Museum, Sacramento, California
Delaware Art Museum, Wilmington, Delaware
The Detroit Institute of Arts, Detroit, Michigan
Dinnerware Museum, Ann Arbor, Michigan
The Everson Museum of Art, Syracuse, New York
The Flint Institute of Arts, Flint, Michigan
Gardiner Museum, Toronto, Ontario, Canada
Hunter Museum of American Art, Chattanooga, TN
Kansas City Art Institute, Kansas City, Missouri
Krannert Art Museum, Champaign, IL
Los Angeles County Museum of Art, Los Angeles, California
The Mint Museum, Charlotte, North Carolina
Museums of Art and Design, New York, New York
The Museum of Fine Arts, Houston, Texas
The Newark Museum, Newark, New Jersey
Racine Art Museum, Racine, Wisconsin
Smithsonian American Art Museum, Washington, D.C.
University of Michigan Museum of Art, Ann Arbor, Michigan
Yixing Art Museum, Yixing, China

Selected solo exhibitions 

Glick's solo exhibitions include:

2016-2017: John Glick: A Legacy in Clay, Cranbrook Art Museum, Bloomfield Hills, MI
2006: John Glick: Looking Back - Making Now, 42 Years in Clay, Birmingham Bloomfield Art Center, Birmingham, MI
1990: A Retrospective Selection Plus Recent Works, Fosdick-Nelson Gallery, School of Art & Design, Alfred University, Alfred, NY
1975: Ten Year Retrospective Exhibition: John Glick, Pewabic Pottery, Detroit, MI

Selected group exhibitions 

Glick's work has been included in the following group exhibitions:

2017: Major Mud 3, The Morean Arts Center, St. Petersburg, Florida
2015: Standing on Ceremony: Functional Ware from RAM's Collection, Racine Art Museum, Racine, Wisconsin
2014: Magic Mud: Masterworks in Clay from RAM's Collection, Racine Art Museum, Racine, Wisconsin
2014: White Gold: The Appeal of Lustre, Racine Art Museum, Racine, Wisconsin
2013: Plates & Platters: Salon Style, The Clay Studio, Philadelphia, Pennsylvania
2011: Big Creek Pottery: A Social History of a Visual Idea 1967-1983, Santa Cruz Museum of Art and History, Santa Cruz, California
2007: Cityscape/Landscape, A Group Exhibition, The Clay Studio, Philadelphia, Pennsylvania
2006: 20th Anniversary of Watershed Center for Ceramic Arts: Invitational Exhibition, The Society of Arts and Crafts, Boston, Massachusetts
2005: National Teapot Show VI, Cedar Creek Gallery, Creedmoor, North Carolina
2004: When Form Meets Function, Ella Sharp Museum, Jackson, Michigan
2002: Great Pots: Contemporary Ceramics from Function to Fantasy, Newark Museum of Art, Newark, New Jersey
2000: Color and Fire: Defining Moments in Studio Ceramics, 1950-2000, Los Angeles County Museum of Art, Los Angeles, California (and tour)
1999: Pacific Tides: The Influence of the Pacific Rim on Contemporary American Ceramics, Lancaster Art Museum, Lancaster, Pennsylvania
1995: In Praise of Craft, Renwick Gallery, within Smithsonian American Art Museum, Washington, D.C.
1989: Surface and Form, National Museum of Ceramic Art, Baltimore, Maryland

References 

1938 births
2017 deaths
American potters
Cranbrook Academy of Art alumni
Artists from Detroit
Wayne State University alumni
American ceramists